Imperia railway station is a railway station serving the city of Imperia, in Liguria, northwestern Italy. The station is located on the Genoa–Ventimiglia railway and was opened on 11 December 2016. The train services are operated by Trenitalia and Thello.

History

As part of the continuing project to increase capacity, a new double-track line has been constructed to run parallel to the old line along a route further inland. The new Imperia station replaced the two old stations, which have been closed.

Train services
The station is served by the following service(s):

InterCity services   -   - Genoa -  -  -   -  
InterCity services   -   - Genoa -  
Regional services    -   - Genoa - Sestri Levante -  - Santo Stefano di Magra

See also

History of rail transport in Italy
List of railway stations in Liguria
Rail transport in Italy
Railway stations in Italy

References

External links

This article is based upon a translation of the Italian language version as at May 2017.

Province of Imperia
Railway stations in Liguria
Railway stations opened in 2016